Coffin–Siris Syndrome (CSS), first described in 1970 by Dr Coffin and Dr Siris, is a rare genetic disorder that causes developmental delays and absent fifth finger and toe nails.
There had been 31 reported cases by 1991. The number of occurrences since then has grown and is now reported to be around 200.

The differential includes Nicolaides–Baraitser syndrome.

Presentation
 mild to moderate to severe intellectual disability, also called "developmental disability"
 short fifth digits with hypoplastic or absent nails
 low birth weight
 feeding difficulties upon birth
 frequent respiratory infections during infancy
 hypotonia
 joint laxity
 delayed bone age
 microcephaly
 coarse facial features, including wide nose, wide mouth, and thick eyebrows and lashes

Causes 
Disease can be inherited as an autosomal dominant trait, however most cases of CSS appear to be the result of a de novo mutation. 

This syndrome has been associated with mutations in the ARID1B gene, which is the most prevalent in CSS.

There are also multiple genes mutations associated to this syndrome, including SOX11, ARID2, DPF2, PHF6, SMARCA2, SMARCA4, SMARCB1, SMARCC2, SMARCE1, SOX4.

The diagnosis is generally based on the presence of major and at least one minor clinical sign and can be confirmed by molecular genetic testing of the causative genes. Recent studies revealed that fifth finger nail/distal phalanx hypoplasia or aplasia is not a mandatory finding.

Typically, lab work will be done to rule out other conditions and genetic testing will also be performed to get the official diagnosis.

Treatment

There is no known cure or standard for treatment. Treatment is based on symptoms and may include physical, occupational and speech therapy and  educational services as well.

References

External links 
 Coffin–Siris syndrome on Orphanet
 

Syndromes with intellectual disability
Genetic disorders with OMIM but no gene
Syndromes affecting the nervous system